Saeed Jassim (Arabic:سعيد جاسم) (born 2 March 1995) is an Emirati footballer who plays as a forward for Ajman.

External links

References

Emirati footballers
1995 births
Living people
Al Ahli Club (Dubai) players
Shabab Al-Ahli Club players
Al Dhafra FC players
Hatta Club players
Ajman Club players
Place of birth missing (living people)
UAE Pro League players
Association football forwards